Baron Johan Gustaf Nils Samuel Åkerhielm af Margaretelund (24 June 1833 – 2 April 1900) was a Swedish politician, a baron, a landowner,  member of the Riksdag from 1859 to 1866 and from 1870 to 1900, a minister of finance from 1874 to 1875, a minister for foreign affairs in 1889, and a prime minister from 1889 to 1891.

He was married to  Ulrika Gyldenstolpe in 1860, with whom he had three children.

Biography 
Gustaf Åkerhielm was born in Stockholm, son to Swedish cabinet member Gustaf Fredrik Åkerhielm and his wife, Elisabeth Sophia Anker.  After diplomatic service in Saint Petersburg and Copenhagen, he had a successful political career, where he had a long succession of different positions in the government from a minister of finance from 1874 to 1875.  In 1889 he was appointed to the position of minister for foreign affairs by Gillis Bildt, and in October of the same year, he became the new prime minister of Sweden. 

Åkerhielm sought to solve military defense issues, but his efforts were blocked because of opposition in the Lower House of the Swedish Parliament.  However, he was able to remain in power due to support he had in the Upper House.  In 1891, he was nevertheless forced to resign after an careless reply to a question about defense, which was interpreted as a war-like threat against Norway.  The exact wording of his statement was unclear, but those who were present said the statement was, more or less, that "a new order for the Army will allow us to speak Swedish with Norwegians." 

He died on 2 April 1900 in Stockholm.

References

External links

1833 births
1900 deaths
Politicians from Stockholm
People from Uppland
Members of the Riksdag
Prime Ministers of Sweden
Swedish Ministers for Finance
Swedish Ministers for Foreign Affairs
Barons of Sweden
19th-century Swedish politicians